The 2017–18 Valparaiso Crusaders men's basketball team represented Valparaiso University during the 2017–18 NCAA Division I men's basketball season. The Crusaders, led by second-year head coach Matt Lottich, played their home games at the Athletics–Recreation Center as first-year members of the Missouri Valley Conference. They finished the season 15–17, 6–12 in MVC play to finish in last place. They lost in the first round of the Missouri Valley tournament to Missouri State.

Previous season
The Crusaders finished the 2016–17 season 24–9, 14–4 in Horizon League play to finish in a tie for the Horizon League regular season championship. As the No. 2 seed in the Horizon League tournament, they lost to Milwaukee in the quarterfinals. They received an invitation to the National Invitation Tournament where they lost in the first round to Illinois.

The season marked the Crusaders' final season as a member of the Horizon League as the school announced on May 25, 2017, that it would be joining the Missouri Valley Conference effective July 1, 2017.

Offseason

2017 recruiting class

Source

Preseason 
In the conference's preseason poll, the Crusaders were picked to finish in sixth place in the MVC. Senior guard Tevonn Walker was named to the preseason All-MVC second team.

Roster

Schedule and results

|-
!colspan=9 style=| Exhibition

|-

|-
!colspan=9 style=| Non-conference regular season

|-
!colspan=9 style=| MVC regular season

|-
!colspan=9 style=| MVC tournament

Source

References

Valparaiso
Valparaiso Beacons men's basketball seasons
Valparaiso Crusaders men's basketball
Valparaiso Crusaders men's basketball